Igor Auzins (born 1949 in Melbourne) is an Australian filmmaker. He joined Crawford Productions in 1969 and worked as a cameraman, then a director. He made documentaries for the South Australian Film Corporation, TV commercials, tele movies and features.

Select Credits
Matlock Police (TV series) - camera operator
Division 4 (1972-73) (TV series) - director
Upstream, Downstream (1975) (short film)
Homicide (1973–76) - won a Logie for his direction of episode "The Firework Man"
The Outsiders (1976) - director Ghost Town
The Big Backyard (1977) (short film) - director
Upstream downstream (1977) (short) - director
All at Sea (1977) (TV movie)
Death Train (1977) (TV movie) - director
The Night Nurse (1977) (TV movie) - director
High Rolling (1977) - director
Chopper Squad (1978) (TV series) - director
Bailey's Bird (1979) (TV series) - director
Water Under the Bridge (1980) (miniseries) - director
A Country Practice (TV series) - director
Runaway Island (1982)  - director
We of the Never Never (1982) - director
Taurus Rising (1982) (Tv series) - director
The Coolangatta Gold (1984) - director

References

External links

Igor Auzins at Screen Australia
Igor Auzins at British Film Institute

1949 births
Living people
Film directors from Melbourne